McClinton Glacier is a glacier between the base of Martin Peninsula and the Jenkins Heights, flowing east-northeast into the Dotson Ice Shelf, on the Walgreen Coast of Marie Byrd Land, Antarctica. It was mapped by the United States Geological Survey from surveys and U.S. Navy aerial photographs, 1959–67, and was named by the Advisory Committee on Antarctic Names after Racie A. McClinton, Jr., U.S. Navy, an LC-130 flight engineer of Squadron VXE-6, who served in nine Operation Deep Freeze deployments through to 1977.

References

Glaciers of Marie Byrd Land